The men's 400 metres was an event at the 1980 Summer Olympics in Moscow. The competition was held from July 27 to July 30, 1980. Fifty athletes from 32 nations competed. The maximum number of athletes per nation had been set at 3 since the 1930 Olympic Congress. The event was won by Viktor Markin of the Soviet Union, the nation's first title in the men's 400 metres and first medal in the event since 1956. With the United States boycotting the Games, the country was not represented on the podium for the first time since 1920. Australia earned its first medal in the event with Rick Mitchell's silver, while East Germany won its first medal with Frank Schaffer's bronze, which was the first medal by any German since the United Team took silvers in 1956 and 1960.

Background

This was the nineteenth appearance of the event, which is one of 12 athletics events to have been held at every Summer Olympics. Defending gold medalist from 1976 Alberto Juantorena of Cuba returned to try to repeat without competition from the Americans, but with an Achilles tendon injury from 1979. Other returning finalists were fourth-place finisher Fons Brijdenbach of Belgium, sixth-place finisher Rick Mitchell of Australia, and seventh-place finisher David Jenkins of Great Britain. The field was relatively open, with no clear favorite.

Botswana, Guinea, Laos, Libya, the Seychelles, Sierra Leone, and Syria appeared in this event for the first time. Great Britain made its seventeenth appearance in the event, most of any present in Moscow but still one behind the United States at 18.

Competition format

The competition retained the basic four-round format from 1920. The "fastest loser" system, introduced in 1964, was available but not used because there were 8 first-round heats, making for even advancement. Each heat has 6 or 7 runners, with the top 4 advancing. The 4 quarterfinals each had 8 runners; the top four athletes in each quarterfinal heat advanced to the semifinals, with no "fastest loser" spots. The semifinals featured 2 heats of 8 runners each. The top four runners in each semifinal heat advanced, making an eight-man final.

Records

These were the standing world and Olympic records (in seconds) prior to the 1976 Summer Olympics.

No world or Olympic records were set during this event.

Schedule

The quarterfinals were moved to the second day (along with the semifinals) after one time on the first day in 1976.

All times are Moscow Time (UTC+3)

Results

Round 1

Eight Round One heats were held at the Lenin Stadium on Sunday, 27 July 1980. The first four in each heat progressed to the quarterfinals.

Heat 1

Heat 2

Heat 3

Heat 4

Heat 5

Heat 6

Heat 7

Heat 8

Quarterfinals

The quarterfinals were held on 28 July 1980. The top four in each heat advanced to the semifinals.

Quarterfinal 1

Quarterfinal 2

Quarterfinal 3

Quarterfinal 4

Semifinals

The semifinals were held on Tuesday, July 29, 1980.

Semifinal 2

Final

See also
 1976 Men's Olympic 400 metres (Montreal)
 1978 Men's European Championships 400 metres (Prague)
 1982 Men's European Championships 400 metres (Athens)
 1983 Men's World Championships 400 metres (Helsinki)
 1984 Men's Olympic 400 metres (Los Angeles)

References

External links
Results

 4
400 metres at the Olympics
Men's events at the 1980 Summer Olympics